The decade of the 15th century in art involved some significant events.

Events
 The 1st century of the Renaissance is completed, but new styles of painting remain strongly linked to the Gothic style, except in the Netherlands and in the Italian city-states.

Works

c.1400: Miniaturist Jacquemart de Hesdin paints The Carrying of the Cross
1401: Commission to design bronze doors for the Florence Baptistery won by Lorenzo Ghiberti
1405: Andrei Rublev paints icons and frescoes for the Cathedral of the Annunciation, Moscow, the first record of his work
1408: Glass painter John Thornton of Coventry completes York Minster's east window in England, the world’s largest expanse of medieval glass
1408: Donatello commissioned to sculpt a marble David for Florence Cathedral, his first significant commission

Births
 1400: Bernardo Martorell – Spanish painter, working in a late gothic style (died 1452)
 1400: Luca della Robbia – Italian sculptor from Florence, noted for his terracotta roundels (died 1482)
 1400: Filarete – Florentine Renaissance architect, sculptor and architectural theorist (died 1469)
 1401: Masaccio – painter of the Quattrocento period of the Italian Renaissance (died 1428)
 1402: Simone di Nanni Ferrucci – Italian sculptor of the Ferrucci family of artists (died unknown)
 1402: Marco del Buono – Italian painter and woodworker (died 1489)
 1403: Dello di Niccolò Delli – Italian sculptor and painter from Florence (died 1470)
 1404: Jacques Daret – Early Netherlandish painter (died 1470)
 1404: Leone Battista Alberti – Italian author whose treatises on painting and architecture are hailed as the founding texts of a new form of art (died 1472)
 1405: Stefano d'Antonio di Vanni – Italian Renaissance painter (died 1483)
 1406: Filippo Lippi – Italian painter of the Italian Quattrocento (15th century) school (died 1469)
 1406: Sano di Pietro – early Italian Renaissance painter from Siena (died 1481)
 1409: Liu Jue – Chinese landscape painter, calligrapher, and poet during the Ming dynasty (died 1472)
 1400–1410: Konrad Witz – German painter, especially of altarpieces (died 1445/1446)

Deaths
 1400: André Beauneveu – Early Netherlandish sculptor and painter (born 1335)
 1403: Niccolò da Bologna – Italian manuscript illuminator (born 1325)
 1405: 'Abd al-Hayy – Persian illustrator and painter (born 1374)
 1405/1406: Claus Sluter – Dutch sculptor (born 1340)

 
Art
Years of the 15th century in art
15th century in art